FK Lešnica is a football club based in Lešnica, Loznica, Serbia.

History
Yugoslav international, Andrija Kojić, played in the club in the late phase of his career.

References

Football clubs in Serbia